Living Among the Rich is a 2011–2012 South Korean television series starring Kim Hye-ja, Oh Ji-eun, Hyun Woo, Lee Sang-yeob and Lee Bo-hee. It aired on JTBC from December 5, 2011 to August 3, 2012.

Synopsis
The story revolves around Kim Hye-ja (Kim Hye-ja) and her daughter Oh Ji-eun (Oh Ji-eun) after they move to the luxurious neighborhood of Cheongdam-dong, in Seoul, after living in the suburbs for years. Their new building turns out to be completely different from their expectations.

Cast

Main
 Kim Hye-ja as Kim Hye-ja
 Oh Ji-eun as Oh Ji-eun
 Hyun Woo as Hyun Woo
 Lee Sang-yeob as Lee Sang-yeob
 Lee Bo-hee as Lee Bo-hee
 Seo Seung-hyun as Seo Seung-hyun
 Woo Hyun as Kim Woo-hyun
 Choi Moo-sung as Choi Moo-sung
 Hwang Jung-min as Hwang Jung-min
 Oh Sang-hoon as Oh Sang-hoon

Supporting
 Jo Kwan-woo as Jo Kwan-woo
 Song Ji-in as Kim Bo-ra
 Shin Yeon-sook as Park Soon-ae
 Yoon Bo-hyun as Yoon Bo-hyun

Special appearances
 Jung Yun-ho
 Yoon Doo-joon
 Ahn Nae-sang
 BtoB

References

External links
  
 

JTBC television dramas
Korean-language television shows
2011 South Korean television series debuts
2012 South Korean television series endings
South Korean television sitcoms
Television shows set in Seoul